Henryk Jarecki (6 December 1846 18 December 1918) was a Polish composer, conductor and teacher.

References

Sources
 

1846 births
1918 deaths
Polish male classical composers